Nerantzis is a Greek surname, with the feminine form being Nerantzi. The name is derived from the bitter orange. Notable people with this surname include:

 Anastasios Nerantzis, Greek politician (1944–2021)
 Pavlos Nerantzis, Greek commander in the Greco-Turkish war of 1897 (died 1911)
 Susanna Nerantzi, 19th century Greek pianist and composer

See also
 Nerantza, a village in the municipality of Velo-Vocha, Corinthia (Peloponnese)
 Nerantzies, a village in the municipality of Sympoliteia, Achaea (Western Greece)

Greek-language surnames
Surnames